Hypo may be short for:
 Hypoglycemia, low blood glucose(sugar)
 Hypodermic needle, syringe, or injection
 Hypothecation
 Hypo Real Estate, a German banking group
 , a type of bank in German speaking countries
in Austria
 Hypo Alpe Adria Bank, former Kärntner Landes-Hypothekenbank
 HYPO Steiermark, brand name of Landes-Hypothekenbank Steiermark
 HYPO Salzburg, brand name of Salzburger Landes-Hypothekenbank
 HYPO Oberösterreich, brand name of Oberösterreichische Landesbank
 Hypo Landesbank Vorarlberg
 Hypo Tirol Bank
 Hypo Noe Gruppe
 Hypo Verband, brand name of Verband der österreichischen Landes-Hypothekenbanken
HYPO may refer to:
 Station HYPO, a signals monitoring and cryptographic intelligence unit

Hypo in chemistry may refer to:
 Sodium thiosulfate, a chemical compound used in photographic processing.